Kadarići (in Cyrillic: Кадарићи) is a village in Bosnia-Herzegovina. It is located in the municipality of Vareš, in the Zenica-Doboj Canton.

Demographics 
The population in the 1991 census was 201, the majority of whom were Muslims (Bosniaks).

According to the 2013 census, its population was 118.

References

Populated places in Vareš